Choerophryne brunhildae is a species of frog in the family Microhylidae. It is endemic to Papua New Guinea and is known from the Adelbert Range, the Bewani Mountains, and the Hunstein Mountains.

Etymology
This species was originally described in the genus Albericus, named for Alberich, the dwarf in Scandinavian mythology and Richard Wagner's opera cycle Der Ring des Nibelungen. Menzies named the species he described after Alberich's companions in the mythodology. The specific name brunhildae is derived from Brunhild.

Description
Nine unsexed individuals in the type series measure  in snout–urostyle length. Examination of six of these revealed one female and five males. Choerophryne brunhildae  shares the general appearance of other former Albericus species: brown dorsum with lighter or darker irregular mottling, warty dorsal skin, and short and road head with blunt snout and relatively large eyes. Distinctive features of this species are conspicuous lumbar ocelli and ventrum that is densely stippled dark and light all over. One specimen was slightly greenish on the head.

The male advertisement call has been described as a "rubbery squeak". Note length is about 500 ms, and pulse rate varies within a note.

Habitat and conservation
Choerophryne brunhildae lives in forest habitats and is sometimes seen in rural gardens. It can be locally common. No major threats to it are known as it seems to tolerate some habitat modification and plenty of suitable habitat remains.

References

brunhildae
Amphibians of Papua New Guinea
Endemic fauna of Papua New Guinea
Amphibians described in 1999
Taxonomy articles created by Polbot